"Insanity" is a song written by Peter Mansson, Patric Sarin, Darin Zanyar and recorded by Swedish singer Darin. It was released as the fourth single from Darin's third studio record Break the News, though it was the first release from the album in Germany and other selected European countries.

Formats and track listings
Enhanced CD Maxi single:

"Insanity" — 3:45
"Insanity" (The Attic House Mix) — 7:23
"Insanity" (Instrumental) — 3:46
"The Anthem" — 3.01
"Insanity" (Video) — 3:45
"Insanity" (Video "making of") — 4:44

Charts
"Insanity" debuted in Germany at number 47. It spent eight weeks on the chart and peaked at number 20 in its ninth week.

References

2007 singles
Darin (singer) songs
Electropop songs
2006 songs
EMI Records singles
Songs written by Patric Sarin
Songs written by Darin (singer)
Songs written by Peter Mansson